Laureles is a census-designated place (CDP) in Cameron County, Texas, United States. The population was 3,692 at the 2010 census. It is part of the Brownsville–Harlingen Metropolitan Statistical Area.  Laureles is an area between Los Fresnos and San Benito, Texas.

Geography
Laureles is located at  (26.113362, -97.489552).

Demographics
As of the census of 2010, there were 3,692 people, 753 households, and 692 families residing in the CDP. The population density was 676.6 people per square mile (261.0/km2). There were 819 housing units at an average density of 168.7/sq mi (65.1/km2). The racial makeup of the CDP was 97.66% White, 0.09% African American, 0.33% Native American, 1.04% from other races, and 0.88% from two or more races. Hispanic or Latino of any race were 98.05% of the population.

There were 753 households, out of which 64.9% had children under the age of 18 living with them, 71.2% were married couples living together, 15.8% had a female householder with no husband present, and 8.0% were non-families. 7.4% of all households were made up of individuals, and 2.8% had someone living alone who was 65 years of age or older. The average household size was 4.36 and the average family size was 4.56.

In the CDP, the population was spread out, with 42.0% under the age of 18, 12.0% from 18 to 24, 27.7% from 25 to 44, 13.6% from 45 to 64, and 4.6% who were 65 years of age or older. The median age was 22 years. For every 100 females, there were 94.1 males. For every 100 females age 18 and over, there were 88.0 males.

The median income for a household in the CDP was $20,172, and the median income for a family was $20,608. Males had a median income of $16,431 versus $13,255 for females. The per capita income for the CDP was $5,812. About 40.6% of families and 41.4% of the population were below the poverty line, including 49.8% of those under age 18 and 63.2% of those age 65 or over.

Education
Laureles is served by the Los Fresnos Consolidated Independent School District.

In addition, South Texas Independent School District operates magnet schools that serve the community.

References

Census-designated places in Cameron County, Texas
Census-designated places in Texas